His Fighting Blood is a 1935 American Western film directed by John English and starring Kermit Maynard, Polly Ann Young and Paul Fix. It was produced on Poverty Row as a second feature. The film's sets were designed by the art director Fred Preble.

Cast
 Kermit Maynard as Tom Elliott, RCMP 
 Polly Ann Young as Doris Carstairs 
 Paul Fix as Phil Elliott 
 Ben Hendricks Jr. as Mack MacDonald, RCMP 
 Ted Adams as Marsden 
 Joseph W. Girard as RCMP Inspector Carstairs 
 Frank LaRue as Al Gordon 
 Frank O'Connor as Dick Ingram 
 Charles King as Constable Black, RCMP 
 Jack Cheatham as Constable Clark, RCMP 
 Edward Cecil as Prison Warden 
 Theodore Lorch as A. Leslie, the Jeweler 
 Rocky as Tom's Horse

References

Bibliography
 Goble, Alan. The Complete Index to Literary Sources in Film. Walter de Gruyter, 1999.

External links

1935 films
1935 Western (genre) films
American Western (genre) films
Films directed by John English
Royal Canadian Mounted Police in fiction
Northern (genre) films
1930s English-language films
1930s American films